Clinton Road was a station stop located on the Garden City-Mitchel Field Secondary branch of the Long Island Rail Road in the village of Garden City, New York.  The station opened in 1915 on a line originally built by the Central Railroad of Long Island and was served by shuttle trains running between Country Life Press and Mitchel Field. Passenger service at Clinton Road ended on May 15, 1953.

The station building is currently used by the Garden City Fire Department as a fire house.

References

External links
Shuttle Service - Garden City to Salisbury Plains Part 1 (Arrt's Archives)
Shuttle Service - Garden City to Salisbury Plains Part 2 (Arrt's Archives)

Railway stations in the United States opened in 1915
1915 establishments in New York (state)
1953 disestablishments in New York (state)
Railway stations closed in 1953
Former Long Island Rail Road stations in Nassau County, New York
Garden City, New York